The 2018–19 Curaçao Promé Divishon is the 93rd season of the Curaçao Promé Divishon, the top division football competition in Curaçao. The season began on 28 October 2018.

Regular season

Kaya 6

Kaya 4

Championship final

References

External links
Federashon Futbòl Kòrsou

Curaçao Sekshon Pagá seasons
1
Curacao